Nu skool breaks (or nu breaks as it is sometimes referred) is a subgenre of breakbeat originating during the period between 1998 and 2002. The style is usually characterized by more abstract, more technical sounds, sometimes incorporated from other genres of electronic dance music, including UK garage, electro, and drum and bass. Typically, tracks ranged between 125 and 140 beats per minute (bpm), often featuring a dominant bass line. In contrast with big beat, another subgenre of breakbeat, the sound set consisted less of hip hop samples and acid-type sounds, instead emphasizing dance-friendliness and "new" sounds produced by modern production techniques using synthesizers, effect processors, and computers.

Origins
The term "nu skool breaks" is widely attributed to Rennie Pilgrem and Adam Freeland, who used it to describe the sound at their night Friction, which was launched at Bar Rumba in 1996, with promoter Ian Williams.

The tracks "Renegades" by Uptown Connection and "Double Impact" by Boundarie Hunters are considered to be the earliest produced to formally adopt the genre.

In 1998, the term "Nu Skool Breaks" was used on two compilations, Nu Skool Breakz, Volume 1 and 2, mixed by Rennie Pilgrem and released through UK-based Kickin Records.  The first volume of these was recorded live at the aforementioned London club night Friction.

Labels that featured early Nu Skool Breaks releases included Botchit & Scarper, Fuel Records (UK), Hard Hands, Marine Parade Records, TCR, and Ultimatum Breaks.

Artists

 Aquasky
 BLIM
 Dylan Rhymes
 Buckfunk 3000
 Evil Nine
 Freq Nasty
 General Midi
 Hexadecimal
 Hybrid
 Hyper
 Ils
 Koma and Bones
 Lee Coombs
 Meat Katie
 Plump DJs
 Stanton Warriors
 Tipper

References

External links
  Nubreaks.com online radio and community
  the international breakbeat awards
  Future Funk Squad won "Album of the Year" at Breakspoil Awards 2015
  New generation of nu skool breaks - The Sables and Future Funk Squad "Right Time Is Now"

Breakbeat genres
English styles of music